"Dear Lord and Father of Mankind" is a hymn with words taken from a longer poem, "The Brewing of Soma" by American Quaker poet John Greenleaf Whittier. The adaptation was made by Garrett Horder in his 1884 Congregational Hymns.

In the many countries the hymn is most usually sung to the tune "Repton" by Hubert Parry; however, in the US, the prevalent tune is "Rest" by Frederick Charles Maker.

Text
The text set appears below. Some hymnal editors omit the fourth stanza or resequence the stanza so that the fifth stanza as printed here comes last.

If sung to Parry's tune, "Repton", the last line of each stanza is repeated.

It is often customary, when singing the final stanza as printed here, to gradually sing louder from "Let sense be dumb...", reaching a crescendo on "...the earthquake, wind and fire", before then singing the last line "O still, small voice of calm" much more softly.

The Brewing of Soma

"The Brewing of Soma" is the Whittier poem (1872) from which the hymn is taken.  Soma was a sacred ritual drink in Vedic religion, going back to Proto-Indo-Iranian times (ca. 2000 BC), possibly with hallucinogenic properties.

The storyline is of Vedic priests brewing and drinking Soma in an attempt to experience divinity. It describes the whole population getting drunk on Soma. It compares this to some Christians' use of "music, incense, vigils drear, and trance, to bring the skies more near, or lift men up to heaven!" But all in vain - it is mere intoxication.

Whittier ends by describing the true method for contact with the divine, as practised by Quakers:
sober lives dedicated to doing God's will, seeking silence and selflessness in order to hear the "still, small voice", described in I Kings 19:11-13 as the authentic voice of God, rather than earthquake, wind or fire.

The poem opens with a quote from the Rigveda, attributed to Vasishtha:
These libations mixed with milk have been prepared for Indra:
offer Soma to the drinker of Soma. (Rv. vii. 32, trans. Max Müller).

Associated tunes

Hubert Parry originally wrote the music for what became Repton in 1888 for the contralto aria 'Long since in Egypt's plenteous land' in his oratorio Judith.  In 1924 George Gilbert Stocks, director of music at Repton School, set it to 'Dear Lord and Father of mankind' in a supplement of tunes for use in the school chapel. Despite the need to repeat the last line of words, Repton provides an inspired matching of lyrics and tune.  By this time, Rest, by Frederick Maker (matching the metrical pattern without repetition), was already well established with the lyrics in the United States.

Tunes it can be sung to are
 Repton by Hubert Parry
 Rest by Frederick Charles Maker
 Hammersmith by William Henry Gladstone
 Elegy for Dunkirk by Dario Marianelli

Serenity (song by Charles Ives)
The American composer Charles Ives took stanzas 14 and 16 of The Brewing of Soma ("O Sabbath rest.../Drop Thy still dews...") and set them to music as the song "Serenity"; however, Ives quite likely extracted his two stanzas from the hymn rather than from the original poem.  Published in his collection: "114 songs", in 1919, the first documented performance of the Ives version was by mezzo-soprano Mary Bell, accompanied by pianist Julius Hijman.

Uses
 In 2005 the hymn was voted second in BBC One show Songs of Praise poll to find the United Kingdom's favourite hymn.
 It was used in the Broadway production of the musical Jekyll & Hyde, at the wedding scene.
 It can be heard being sung by the Bede College Choir in the 2007 film Atonement during the Dunkirk evacuation.
 The pipes and drums of the Royal Scots Dragoon Guards covered the hymn for their 2007 album, Spirit of the Glen: Journey.
 It is quoted by the character Josh (Matt Keeslar) in the 1998 film The Last Days of Disco.
On June 12, 2016, the poem (set to the hymn tune Repton) was sung at the Cathedral Sings in the Washington National Cathedral, which was dedicated to the memory of Dr. J. Reilly Lewis, the longtime conductor of the Cathedral Choral Society and founder of the Washington Bach Consort, following his sudden passing on June 9, 2016.
 It was sung and performed by the Cavaliers Drum and Bugle Corps in their 2016 show "Propaganda" to the tune of the Elegy for Dunkirk.
 In a slightly modified lyrics version titled "Dear Ford and Father of Mankind", it was sung and performed in Lincoln Cathedral in The Grand Tour "Funeral for a Ford" (series 3, episode 14).
 In the 2022 TV series, The Crown (Season 5, end of Episode 8), Prince William visits his grandmother after his mother's revealing Panorama interview. William helps his grandmother navigate a new TV system and secures a moment of peace for them both in the hymn.

Notes

External links
 

American Christian hymns
Poetry and hymns by John Greenleaf Whittier
19th-century hymns